Richard Watkins is a horn player.

Richard Watkins may also refer to:

Richard C. Watkins (1858–1941), English-American architect
Richard Watkins (MP) (by 1507–1550), Member of Parliament (MP)

See also
Ricky Watkins, character in Burn Notice